Budhinanda Municipality (Nepali: बुढीनन्दा नगरपालिका) is the newly formed municipality in Bajura District in the Sudurpashchim Province of Nepal. It was formed in March 2017  in line with the Constitution of Nepal 2015 as per the requirement of Ministry of Federal Affairs and General Administration. The name of this municipality is originated after the name of temple and pound Budhinanda.

History
It is formed by merging previous VDCs named Kolti, Kotila, Pandusain, ward no. 8 & 9 of Baddhu VDC and ward no. 9 of Jagannath VDC.

It is the second biggest municipality in terms of population and area of Bajura District. It is divided into 10 wards and the headquarter  of this newly formed municipality is situated at Kolti. It is only municipality in Bajura which has an airport.

Demographics
At the time of the 2011 Nepal census, Budhinanda Municipality had a population of 18,883. Of these, 98.5% spoke Nepali, 1.4% Sherpa and 0.2% other languages as their first language.

In terms of ethnicity/caste, 52.5% were Chhetri, 9.6% Kami, 8.7% Lohar, 6.8% Hill Brahmin, 4.8% Thakuri, 4.8% Damai/Dholi, 4.5% Bhote, 3.3% Sarki, 2.7% Sanyasi/Dasnami, 0.7% other Dalit, 0.5% Mallaha, 0.5% Musalman, 0.3% Badi, 0.1% Newar and 0.3% others.

In terms of religion, 94.9% were Hindu, 4.5% Buddhist and 0.5% Muslim

References

Bajura District
Municipalities of Nepal
Nepal municipalities established in 2017
Municipalities in Bajura District